Raiskums Parish is a territorial unit of Cēsis Municipality in the Vidzeme region of Latvia (Prior to the 2009 Administrative territorial reform it was part of Cēsis District).

Towns, villages and settlements of Raiskums Parish 
Raiskums

References 

Parishes of Latvia
Cēsis Municipality
Vidzeme